Gene Alec Littler (July 21, 1930 – February 15, 2019) was an American professional golfer and a member of the World Golf Hall of Fame. Known for a solid temperament and nicknamed "Gene the Machine" for his smooth, rhythmical swing, he once said that, "Golf is not a game of great shots. It's a game of the best misses. The people who win make the smallest mistakes."

Early years and amateur career
Littler was born in San Diego, California. He played on the 1953 United States Walker Cup team, and won the U.S. Amateur and the California State Amateur that same year. In 1954, he won a PGA Tour event as an amateur, a rare achievement which was not to be repeated until Doug Sanders won the Canadian Open in 1956.

Littler graduated from San Diego State University, and after that served in the United States Navy from 1951 to 1954.

Professional career

An early highlight of Littler's professional playing career was a second-place finish at the 1954 U.S. Open. He finished one shot behind Ed Furgol.

In 1955, he won four times on the tour, but fell into a slump in the late 1950s after tinkering with his swing. In 1959 after taking advice he received from Paul Runyan and adjusting his grip, he recovered to have his best year with five PGA Tour victories. He finished second on the money list that year, which was to remain his career best. Only once from 1954 to 1979 did Littler finish out of the top 60 on the final money list. He was stricken with melanoma cancer found in a lymph node under his left arm in 1972, but came back to win five more times on the PGA Tour. He ended his career with 29 PGA Tour wins, and also won two tournaments in Japan and one in Australia.

One of Littler's 29 PGA Tour wins was unique. When he won the 1975 Bing Crosby National Pro-Am, it marked the first and (so far) only time that a player won that event as a professional after having previously won the pro-amateur portion, which Littler did as a 23-year-old amateur in 1954.

Littler won one major championship – the 1961 U.S. Open. He shot a 68 in the final round to overtake Doug Sanders. He accumulated 17 top-10 finishes in the three U.S.-based majors: seven at the Masters Tournament, five at the PGA Championship, and five at the U.S. Open. In addition to his U.S. Open victory, he had one second-place finish in each of the three U.S. majors, losing playoffs to Billy Casper at the 1970 Masters and to Lanny Wadkins at the 1977 PGA Championship. The latter was the first-ever sudden-death playoff in a major. He was a member of the U.S. Ryder Cup teams of 1961, 1963, 1965, 1967, 1969, 1971 and 1975, and had a 14-5-8 win/loss/tie record including five wins and three ties in 10 singles matches.

Littler received the Ben Hogan Award in 1973 for a courageous comeback from injury or illness, after returning to the tour following treatment for malignant melanoma. Also in 1973, he was given the Bob Jones Award, the highest honor given by the United States Golf Association in recognition of distinguished sportsmanship in golf. In the 1980s and 1990s, Littler played on the Senior PGA Tour, winning eight times. He was inducted into the World Golf Hall of Fame in 1990.

Personal life and death
On January 5, 1951, ten days before joining the Navy, Littler married Shirley Warren, his university classmate. They had a son, Curt, born in March 1954 and a daughter, Suzanne, born in October 1957. Littler died at the age of 88 on February 15, 2019.

In popular culture
Littler inspired Sandy Mac Divot, the main character of the long running comic strip Mac Divot by Jordan Lanski (a former schoolmate of Littler) and Mel Keefer.

Professional wins (54)

PGA Tour wins (29)

PGA Tour playoff record (3–8)

Source:

Japan Golf Tour wins (2)

PGA Tour of Australasia wins (1)

PGA Tour of Australasia playoff record (1–0)

Other wins (2)
this list may be incomplete
1954 California State Open
1966 World Series of Golf

Senior PGA Tour wins (8)

Senior PGA Tour playoff record (1–2)

Japan Senior Tour wins (2)
1983 Coca-Cola Grandslam Championship 
1987 Coca-Cola Grandslam Championship

Other senior wins (10)
1980 World Senior Invitational
1981 Vintage Invitational
1981 Liberty Mutual Legends of Golf (with Bob Rosburg)
1983 Vintage Invitational
1985 Liberty Mutual Legends of Golf (with Don January)
1986 Liberty Mutual Legends of Golf (with Don January)
1994 Liberty Mutual Legends of Golf - Legendary Division (with Don January)
1997 Liberty Mutual Legends of Golf - Legendary Division (with Don January)
2001 Liberty Mutual Legends of Golf - Demaret Division (with Don January)
2004 Liberty Mutual Legends of Golf - Demaret Division (with Don January)

Major championships

Wins (1)

Amateur wins (1)

Results timeline

CUT = missed the halfway cut
DQ = disqualified
WD = withdrew
R64, R32, R16, QF, SF = Round in which player lost in match play
"T" indicates a tie for a place.

Source for U.S. Open and U.S. Amateur: USGA Championship Database

Summary

Most consecutive cuts made – 14 (1962 PGA – 1967 Masters)
Longest streak of top-10s – 4 (1961 U.S. Open – 1962 U.S. Open)

U.S. national team appearances
Amateur
Walker Cup: 1953 (winners)

Professional
Ryder Cup: 1961 (winners), 1963 (winners), 1965 (winners), 1967 (winners), 1969 (tie), 1971 (winners), 1975 (winners)
Hopkins Trophy: 1956 (winners)

See also
List of golfers with most PGA Tour wins

References

External links

American male golfers
San Diego State Aztecs men's golfers
PGA Tour golfers
PGA Tour Champions golfers
Ryder Cup competitors for the United States
Winners of men's major golf championships
World Golf Hall of Fame inductees
Golfers from San Diego
People from Rancho Santa Fe, California
1930 births
2019 deaths